Lapis armenus, also known as Armenian stone or lapis stellatus, in natural history, is a variety of precious stone, resembling lapis lazuli, except that it is softer, and instead of veins of pyrite, is intermixed with green. "The Armenian stone" is so similar to lapis lazuli that it has often not been distinguished from it; Webster's Revised Unabridged Dictionary for instance treats the two terms as synonyms. Probably because they were both blue, blue bice was sometimes misinterpreted to mean . Chemically however lapis lazuli is not at all similar.

Herman Boerhaave believed it rather to rank among semi-metals, and supposed it was composed of both metal and earth. He added that it only differs from lazuli in degree of maturity, and that both of them seem to contain arsenic.

It has been found in Tirol, Hungary, and Transylvania, and used both in mosaic work, to make the blue color azure, and as a treatment of melancholia.

The Encyclopedia Perthensis of 1816 notes that Armenian stone "was anciently  brought of Armenia, but now found in Germany, and Tyrol".

References

Gemstones
Minerals